Nordonia Hills City School District is a school district that serves Northfield Village, Northfield Center, Sagamore Hills, Macedonia, and portions of Boston Heights in northern Summit County, Ohio. The football team of Nordonia High School is the Nordonia Knights. Nordonia Hills is a portmanteau taken from Northfield, Macedonia, and Sagamore Hills. There are 6 schools in the district Northfield Elementary, Rushwood Elementary (built in 1970), Ledgeview Elementary,  Lee Eaton Elementary, Nordonia Middle School, and Nordonia High School.

References

External links 
 Nordonia Hills City School District Website

School districts in Summit County, Ohio